Reda may refer to:

 Reda (surname), list of people with the surname
 Reda (given name), list of people with the given name
 Reda, Poland, a town in Poland
 Reda (river), a river in Poland
 Reda railway station, a railway station in Reda, Poland
 Reza (name), can be spelled Reda
 Reda (fabric mill)